Manuel María Caballero Province is one of the fifteen provinces of the Bolivian Santa Cruz Department and is situated in the department's western parts. The province name honors deputy Manuel María Caballero from Vallegrande, one of the signatories of the Bolivian constitution (Constitución política) of 5 August 1861.

Location 
Manuel María Caballero Province is located between 17° 26' and 18° 15' South and between 64° 07' and 64° 50' West. It extends over 90 km from North to South, and 75 km from West to East.

The province is situated on the western edge of the Bolivian lowlands and borders Cochabamba Department in the West, Vallegrande Province in the South, Florida Province in the East, and Ichilo Province in the Northeast.

Population 
The population of Manuel María Caballero Province has increased by circa 35% over the recent two decades:
1992: 16,074 inhabitants (census)
2001: 20,562 inhabitants (census)
2005: 21,517 inhabitants (est.)
2010: 22,916 inhabitants (est.)

 20.0% of the population is urban population. (1992)

 44.9% of the population are younger than 15 years old. (1992)

 95.4% of the population speak Spanish, 43.8% speak Quechua, and 1.6 speak Aymara. (1992)

 70.1% of the population have no access to electricity, 70.8% have no sanitary facilities. (1992)

 90.1% of the population are Catholics, 8.4% are Protestants. (1992)

Division 
The province comprises two municipios:
Comarapa Municipality – 14,660 inhabitants (2001)
Saipina Municipality – 5,350 inhabitants (2001)

References

External links 
General map of province
Detailed map of province towns and rivers
Population data (Spanish)
Social data (Spanish)

Provinces of Santa Cruz Department (Bolivia)